AJW may refer to:

 Initialism
 AJW Motorcycles (1928–1981), a British motorcycle manufacturer
 All Japan Women's Pro-Wrestling (1968–2005), a Japanese promotion
 Asia & Japan Watch, English-language edition of Asahi Shimbun

 Nickname
 Andy Jones-Wilkins (born 1968), a U.S. long-distance runner

Code
Alpha Jet International (ICAO airline designator AJW)
Ajawa language (ISO 639-3 code "ajw")